"Livin' on a Prayer" is a song by the American rock band Bon Jovi, and is the band's second chart-topping single from their third album Slippery When Wet. Written by Jon Bon Jovi, Richie Sambora and Desmond Child, the single, released in late 1986, was well received at both rock and pop radio and its music video was given heavy rotation at MTV, giving the band their first No. 1 on the Billboard Mainstream Rock chart and their second consecutive No. 1 Billboard Hot 100 hit.

"Livin' on a Prayer" is the band's signature song, topping fan-voted lists and re-charting around the world decades after its release. In 2013, the song was certified triple platinum for over 3 million digital downloads. The official music video reached 1 billion views on YouTube in January 2023.

Song history
Jon Bon Jovi did not like the original recording of this song, which can be found as a hidden track on 100,000,000 Bon Jovi Fans Can't Be Wrong. Lead guitarist Richie Sambora, however, convinced him the song was good, and they reworked it with a new bassline (recorded by Hugh McDonald uncredited), different drum fills and the use of a talk box to include it on Slippery When Wet. The song spent two weeks at number one on the Mainstream Rock Tracks chart, from January 31 to February 14, 1987, and four weeks at number one on the Billboard Hot 100, from February 14 to March 14. It also hit number four on the UK Singles Chart.

The album version of the song, timed around 4:10, fades out at the end. However, the music video game Guitar Hero World Tour features the song's original studio ending, where the band revisit the intro riff and end with a talk box solo; this version ends at 4:53. The original ending is also playable on the similar video game Rock Band 2, though edited in this case (thereby eliminating the talk box solo at the end). The version included on the 2005 DualDisc edition of Slippery When Wet has an extended version of the original ending, with a different talk box solo playing over the riff (possibly taken from an outtake of the song); this version, which fades out at the end like the standard version of the song, ends at 5:06.

After the September 11, 2001 attacks – in which New Jersey was the second-hardest hit state after New York, suffering hundreds of casualties among both WTC workers and first responders – the band performed an acoustic version of this song for New York. Bon Jovi performed a similar version as part of the special America: A Tribute to Heroes.

In 2022, Mike Reno, vocalist of the band Loverboy, revealed to Loudwire he is certain the backing vocals he recorded for this song are used.

Reception and legacy
Billboard said that "metal muscle meets gritty reality in a tough, clanging rocker."  Cash Box said that "Solid chorus and ringing guitar highlight Jon Bon Jovi’s gutsy singing." 

In 2006, online voters rated "Livin' on a Prayer" No. 1 on VH1's list of The 100 Greatest Songs of the '80s. More recently, in New Zealand, "Livin' on a Prayer" was No. 1 on the C4 music channel's show U Choose 40, on the 80's Icons list. It was also No. 1 on the "Sing-a-long Classics List". After Bon Jovi performed in New Zealand on January 28, 2008, while on their Lost Highway Tour, the song re-entered the official New Zealand RIANZ singles chart at number 24, over twenty years after the initial release.

Australian music TV channel MAX placed the song at No. 18 on their 2008 countdown "Rock Songs: Top 100". In 2009, the song returned to the charts in the UK, notably hitting the number-one spot on the UK Rock Chart.

In 2010, it was chosen in an online vote on the Grammy.com website over the group's more recent hits "Always" and "It's My Life" to be played live by the band on the 52nd Grammy Awards telecast.

In the Billboard Hot 100 50th Anniversary list, "Livin' on a Prayer" was named the 46th greatest rock song of all time. After the song was released for download, the song has sold 3.4 million digital copies in the US as of November 2014. Louder Sound and Billboard ranked the song number four and number two, respectively, on their lists of the 10 greatest Bon Jovi songs.

The song, including its original ending, is also playable on the music video games Guitar Hero World Tour and Rock Band 2. The song was re-worked and made available to download on November 9, 2010, for use in the Rock Band 3 music gaming platform to take advantage of PRO mode which allows use of a real guitar / bass guitar, and standard MIDI-compatible electronic drum kits / keyboards in addition to up to three-part harmony or backup vocals.

In November 2013, the song made its return to the Billboard Hot 100 at number 25, due to a viral video.

In 2017, ShortList's Dave Fawbert listed the song as containing "one of the greatest key changes in music history".

In 2021, Rolling Stone ranked the song at number 457 in their updated list of the 500 Greatest Songs of All Time.

Lyrics
The song reveals two characters, Tommy and Gina, a working-class couple who struggle to make ends meet. Tommy loses his job as a dockworker due to a strike while Gina works as a diner waitress. The storyline was loosely based on real-life events that Jon Bon Jovi and songwriter Desmond Child experienced in the 1970s. Before becoming prolific artists and songwriters, Desmond Child and his then-girlfriend, singer-songwriter Maria Vidal, both lived together and had already begun their music careers but worked day jobs to help sustain a living; Child was a taxi driver in New York while Vidal worked as a waitress in a diner named "Once Upon A Stove", similar to Gina in the song. The owner, manager, and other employees of the diner nicknamed Vidal as "Gina" due to her slight physical resemblance to Italian actress and photographer Gina Lollobrigida.

"It deals with the way that two kids – Tommy and Gina – face life's struggles," noted Bon Jovi, "and how their love and ambitions get them through the hard times. It's working class and it's real… I wanted to incorporate the movie element, and tell a story about people I knew. So instead of doing what I did on 'Runaway', where the girl didn't have a name, I gave them names, which gave them an identity... Tommy and Gina aren't two specific people; they represent a lifestyle." Tommy and Gina are also referred to in Bon Jovi's 2000 single "It's My Life".

In a 2002 interview, Bon Jovi said that he wrote the song as a response to the Reagan Era, adding, "trickle-down economics are really inspirational to writing songs".

Music video
The music video was filmed on September 17, 1986, at the Grand Olympic Auditorium in Los Angeles, California and was directed by Wayne Isham. It all starts with a silhouette of the band walking down the hall and it features shots of the band rehearsing, filmed in black and white, then playing in front of a crowd, in color.

In the beginning of the video, Jon has a harness attached by professional stunt coordinators and stunt spotters, and during the final chorus, he soars over the crowd via overhead wires attached to the harness.

Alternative versions
Bon Jovi have themselves reworked the song several times, including an acoustic live version that served as a precursor to the MTV Unplugged series and a re-recorded version of the song, "Prayer '94," which appeared on U.S. versions of their Cross Road hits collection.

Personnel
Bon Jovi
Jon Bon Jovi – lead vocals
Richie Sambora – electric guitar, talk box, backing vocals
Alec John Such – bass guitar (credited), backing vocals
Tico Torres – drums, percussion, finger cymbals
David Bryan – keyboards, backing vocals

Additional musicians
Hugh McDonald – bass (wrote and recorded the bass parts, uncredited)
Joani Bye – backing vocals
Nancy Nash – backing vocals

Charts

Weekly charts

Year-end charts

Sales and certifications

In popular culture
In May 2013, the song was featured in a segment on The Tonight Show with Jay Leno. In this segment, a man and his wife were at a gas station when they were suddenly offered a free tank of gas in exchange for singing a song. The husband, Will Sims II, responded by singing "Livin' on a Prayer." The video of the segment went viral, prompting Jon Bon Jovi to record a video personally thanking the couple for having "so much fun" with the band's song.

In 2019, Grammy Award-winning singer Michelle Williams performed the song on the second US series of The Masked Singer.

See also
List of glam metal albums and songs

References

1986 songs
1986 singles
Bon Jovi songs
Billboard Hot 100 number-one singles
Cashbox number-one singles
Music videos directed by Wayne Isham
Number-one singles in Norway
Number-one singles in New Zealand
RPM Top Singles number-one singles
Songs written by Desmond Child
Songs about labor
Songs written by Richie Sambora
Songs written by Jon Bon Jovi
Song recordings produced by Bruce Fairbairn
Mercury Records singles
American power pop songs